There were several independent candidates in the 1988 Canadian federal election, none of whom were elected.  Information about these candidates may be found on this page.

Manitoba

Gerry West Winnipeg—Transcona

West was a sales representative.  He received 156 votes (0.37%), finishing fifth against New Democratic Party incumbent Bill Blaikie.

Nova Scotia

Rik Gates, Annapolis Valley-Hant

Gates was a student at Acadia University. He received 200 votes (0.43%), finishing fifth against Progressive Conservative Party of Canada incumbent Pat Nowlan.

References